The WSA World Series 2012 is a series of women's squash tournaments which are part of the Women's Squash Association (WSA) World Tour for the 2012 squash season. The WSA World Series tournaments are some of the most prestigious events on the women's tour. The best-performing players in the World Series events qualify for the annual 2012 WSA World Series Finals tournament. Nicol David won her second WSA World Series Squash Finals trophy, beating Laura Massaro in the final.

WSA World Series Ranking Points
WSA World Series events also have a separate World Series ranking. Points for this are calculated on a cumulative basis after each World Series event.

2012 Tournaments

World Series Standings 2012

Bold – The first eight players present for the final

References

External links 
 WSA World Series Standings website
 WSA Tour Rules
 WSA World Series 2012 SquashSite website

See also
 PSA World Series 2012
 WSA World Tour 2012
 Official Women's Squash World Ranking

WSA World Tour seasons
2012 in squash